Yuen Shun Yi may refer to:

Yuen Shun-yi (袁信義), a Hong Kong film actor, stuntman and action coordinator
Yuen Siu-tien (袁小田) (1912-1979), a Hong Kong martial arts film actor